Justin Windell Gordon (born December 20, 1993) is an American basketball player for the Newcastle Eagles of the British Basketball League (BBL). He played college basketball for the Wofford Terriers.

Career

Australia
Gordon made his professional debut with Australian side Sandringham Sabres of the South East Australian Basketball League, in the 2016–17 season.

Morocco
The following season, Gordon played in Morocco with Amal Essaouira.

Feyenoord
In August 2018, Gordon signed a one-year contract with Feyenoord Basketbal of the Dutch Basketball League (DBL). On October 6, he had a team-high 13 points and 11 rebounds in his DBL debut, in an 86–57 loss to Den Bosch. Gordon ended the season as the DBL's third leading scorer, with 17.6 points per game for Feyenoord.

PS Karlsruhe Lions
On July 5, 2019, Gordon signed with PS Karlsruhe Lions of the German ProA.

Newcastle Eagles
On September 6, 2020, Gordon joined BBL side Newcastle Eagles as part of the 2020–2021 roster. On January 24, 2021 they won the BBL Cup beating London Lions 84–77. Gordon picked up the Cup Final MVP honours finishing with 18 points, 15 rebounds, three assists and three blocks.

PVSK Panthers
On May 31, 2021, he has signed with Limburg United of the Pro Basketball League. Before the start of the competition, Gordon and Limburg parted ways. On September 24, he signed with the PVSK Panthers of the Nemzeti Bajnokság I/A.

References

External links
Wofford Terriers bio

1993 births
Living people
Amal Essaouira players
American expatriate basketball people in Australia
American expatriate basketball people in Germany
American expatriate basketball people in Hungary
American expatriate basketball people in Morocco
American expatriate basketball people in the Netherlands
American expatriate basketball people in the United Kingdom
American men's basketball players
Basketball players from Charlotte, North Carolina
Dutch Basketball League players
Feyenoord Basketball players
PS Karlsruhe Lions players
PVSK Panthers players
Sandringham Sabres players
Small forwards
Wofford Terriers men's basketball players